Amadis de Gaule is an opera by the French composers Jean-Benjamin de La Borde and Pierre Montan Berton, first performed at the Académie Royale de Musique, Paris (the Paris Opera) on 26 November 1771. It takes the form of a tragédie en musique in five acts. The opera is a new setting of a libretto by Philippe Quinault, originally set by Jean-Baptiste Lully in 1684.

Sources
 Félix Clément and Pierre Larousse Dictionnaire des Opéras, p.26.

1771 operas
Operas
French-language operas
Tragédies en musique
Operas by Jean-Benjamin de La Borde